The GRE subject test in chemistry is a standardized test in the United States created by the Educational Testing Service, and is designed to assess a candidate's potential for graduate or post-graduate study in the field of chemistry.  It contains questions from many fields of chemistry. 15% of the questions will come from analytical chemistry, 25% will come from inorganic chemistry, 30% will come from organic chemistry and 30% will come from physical chemistry.

This exam, like all the GRE subject tests, is paper-based, as opposed to the GRE general test which is usually computer-based.  It contains 130 questions, which are to be answered within 2 hours and 50 minutes.  Scores on this exam are sometimes required for entrance to chemistry Ph.D. programs in the United States.

Scores are scaled and then reported as a number between 200 and 990; however, in recent versions of the test, the maximum and minimum reported scores have been 940 (corresponding to the 99 percentile) and 460 (1 percentile) respectively. The mean score for all test takers from July, 2009, to July, 2012, was 703 with a standard deviation of 115.

Tests generally take place three times per year, on one Saturday in each of September, October, and April.  Students must register for the exam approximately five weeks before the administration.

The test will be discontinued following the April 2023 administration.

See also

 Graduate Record Examination
 GRE Biochemistry Test
 GRE Biology Test
 GRE Literature in English Test
 GRE Mathematics Test
 GRE Physics Test
 GRE Psychology Test
 Graduate Management Admission Test (GMAT)
 Graduate Aptitude Test in Engineering (GATE)

References 

Chemistry education
Standardized tests
GRE standardized tests